Las Murias de Babia (Astur-Leonese: Las Murias) is a locality located in the municipality of Cabrillanes, in León province, Castile and León, Spain. As of 2020, it has a population of 23.

Geography 
Las Murias is located 87km northwest of León, Spain.

References

Populated places in the Province of León